Maunby is a village and civil parish in the Hambleton district of North Yorkshire, England, about six miles south of Northallerton and on the River Swale.

The parish church is St Michael & All Angels. In the churchyard is the grave of Victoria Cross-holder Alan Richard Hill-Walker who lived at Maunby Hall.

References

External links

Villages in North Yorkshire
Civil parishes in North Yorkshire